Pfingstberg (Potsdam) is a hill in Brandenburg, Germany. The Belvedere auf dem Pfingstberg sits atop the hill.

Hills of Brandenburg